Jan Fabre (born 14 December 1958) is a Belgian multidisciplinary artist, playwright, stage director, choreographer and designer.

Conviction for sexual assault and harassment 
In September 2018, twenty former members of Fabre's performing arts company, Troubleyn (Antwerp, Belgium) accused him of sexual harassment, abuse of power, and assault. These accusations strongly diminished Fabre's standing in the artistic community. 

On 28 June 2021, Belgiums' Labour Auditor, acting in his capacity as prosecutor since the alleged offenses were committed in the workplace, indicted Fabre on charges of violence at work and sexual harassment.

On Friday April 29, 2022 Jan Fabre was convicted by the Criminal Court of Antwerp and sentenced to a 18-month suspended prison term and deprivation of certain civic rights for 5 years. Civic rights, in many European jurisdictions, include political rights (such as the right to be elected to office), judicial rights (representing or assisting a party in a judicial process) and guardianship rights (such as the right to be a guardian or conservator for another person's estate).

Biography and career
Fabre studied at the Municipal Institute of Decorative Arts and the Royal Academy of Fine Arts in Antwerp (BE).

He wrote his first scripts for theatre between 1976 and 1980 and also did his first solo performances. During his 'money-performances', he burned money and wrote the word 'MONEY' with the ashes. In 1977, he renamed the street where he lived to "Jan Fabre Street" and fixed a commemorative plaque "Here lives and works Jan Fabre" to the house of his parents, analogous to the commemorative plate on the house of Vincent van Gogh in the same street. In 1978 he made drawings with his own blood during the solo performance 'My body, my blood, my landscape'. From 1980, Fabre began his career as a stage director and stage designer. In 1986 he established the Troubleyn/Jan Fabre theatre company with extensive international operations; its home base is Antwerp, Belgium.

Fabre became known for his Bic-art (ballpoint drawings). In 1980, in 'The Bic-Art Room', he had himself locked up for three days and three nights in a white cube full of objects, drawing with blue "Bic" ballpoint pens as an alternative to "Big" art. In 1990 he covered an entire building with ballpoint drawings.

Fabre also explored relationships between drawing and sculpture creating sculptures in bronze (among them The man who measures the clouds and Searching for Utopia) and with beetles. He decorated the ceiling of the Royal Palace in Brussels with one million six hundred thousand jewel-scarab wing cases for his work Heaven of Delight. In 2004 he erected Totem, a giant bug stuck on a 70-foot steel needle, on the Ladeuzeplein in Leuven (BE).

In September 2016 Fabre made an attempt to not break cyclist Eddy Merckx's 1972 hour record at the Tête d'Or Velodrome in Lyon. Fabre completed a total of 23km in an hour, compared to Merckx's record of over 49km. Merckx, fellow cyclist Raymond Poulidor, and veteran cycling commentator Daniel Mangeas commentated the event, which was performed as the opening of his "Stigmata" retrospective exhibition organised by the Musée d'art contemporain de Lyon. Fabre described the attempt as "how to remain a dwarf in the land of giants".

Controversy 

On 26 October 2012, several media reported how during a shoot in the Antwerp town hall for a forthcoming film on Fabre, living cats were thrown repeatedly several meters spinning into the air, after which they made a hard landing on the steps of the entrance hall. Animal welfare executive chairman Luc Bungeneers said he was having a meeting with his party chairman when he heard howling cats. "To my horror, we found cats were being assaulted in the name of art", Bungeneers said. "It went on for several hours." The filming was eventually aborted after protests from the crew's own technicians. Later that day, Fabre claimed all cats were still in good health and that it was a conspiracy of the political party NVA.
Fabre also received 20,000 emails slamming his act. He had also been attacked seven times by men carrying clubs whilst out jogging in the park and been forced to sleep in a different location every night. Antwerp's deputy mayor for animal well-being and the animal rights organisation Global Action in the Interest of Animals also launched complaints about Fabre's controversial act.

Then in February 2016, Jan Fabre was appointed by the Greek Ministry of Culture as the Creative Director of the annual Athens – Epidaurus Festival. He resigned less than two months later, on 2 April 2016, after a huge controversy over his plan to turn Greece's major arts festival into "a tribute to Belgium" and devote eight of the festival's ten productions to those from his homeland.

In October 2016, the Russian State Hermitage museum staged a Fabre exhibition which drew a lot of criticism from visitors and institutions such as the Russian Orthodox Church. Stuffed animals in strange poses sparked outcry among Russian social media network users who launched a campaign under the hashtag #позорэрмитажу, or "Shame on you, Hermitage". The number of posts in Instagram tagged this way amounted to nearly 10,000 by late November. The museum then organized an event to meet the public and explain the exhibition after refusing to stop the exhibition which was slated to last up to April 2017. The artist repeatedly claimed that the animals used were taken from roads where they had been killed and denied any accusations by critics of cruelty and sadism.

Exhibitions 

 The Angel of Metamorphosis exhibition, Louvre Museum (2008)

Theatre productions 
Theater geschreven met een K is een kater (1980)
Het is theater zoals te verwachten en te voorzien was ("It is Theatre as to be Expected and Foreseen" 1982)
De macht der theaterlijke dwaasheden ("The power of theatrical madness", Venice Biennale 1984)
Das Glas im Kopf wird vom Glas (1987)
Prometheus Landschaft (1988)
Das Interview das stirbt... (1989)
Der Palast um vier Uhr morgens... A.G. (1989)
Die Reinkarnation Gottes (1989)
Das Glas im Kopf wird vom Glas (1990)
The Sound of one hand clapping (1990)
Sweet Temptations (1991)
She was and she is, even (1991)
Wie spreekt mijn gedachte ... (1992)
Silent Screams, Difficult Dreams (1992)
Vervalsing zoals ze is, onvervalst (1992)
Da un’altra faccia del tempo (1993)
Quando la terra si rimette in movimento (1995)
Three Dance-solos (1995)
A dead normal woman (1995)
Universal Copyrights 1 & 9  (1995)
De keizer van het verlies (1996)
The very seat of honour (1997)
Body, Body on the wall (1997)
Glowing Icons (1997)
The Pick-wick-man (1997)
Ik ben jaloers op elke zee… (1997)
The fin comes a little bit earlier this siècle (But business as usual) (1998)
Het nut van de nacht (1999)
As long as the world needs a warrior’s soul (2000)
My movements are alone like streetdogs (2000)
Je suis Sang (conte de fées médiéval) (2001)
Het zwanenmeer (2002)
Swan lake (2002)
Parrots & guinea pigs (2002)
Je suis sang (2003)
Angel of death (2003)
Tannhäuser (co-production) (2004)
Elle était et elle est, même (2004)
Etant donnés (2004)
Quando L'Uomo principale è una donna (2004)
The crying body (2004)
The King of Plagiarism (2005)
History of Tears (2005)
I am a Mistake (2007)
Requiem für eine Metamorphose (2007)
Another Sleepy Dusty Delta Day (2008)
Orgy of Tolerance (2009)
The Servant of Beauty (2010)
Preparatio Mortis (2010)
Prometheus–Landscape II (2011)
Drugs kept me alive (2012)
Tragedy of a Friendship (2013)
 Attends, Attends, Attends... (Pour mon Père) (2014)
Mount Olympus. To Glorify the Cult of Tragedy. A 24-hour performance. (2015)
Belgium Rules/Belgian Rules (2017)
The Generosity of Dorcas (2018)
The Night Writer (2020)

References

External links

 

1958 births
Living people
Belgian contemporary artists
Artists from Antwerp
Belgian sculptors
Art controversies
Film controversies
Royal Academy of Fine Arts (Antwerp) alumni
Members of the Royal Flemish Academy of Belgium for Science and the Arts
Writers from Antwerp
Ballpoint pen art